Ethical Consumer Research Association Ltd (ECRA) is a British not-for-profit publisher, research, political, and campaign organisation which publishes information on the social, ethical and environmental behaviour of companies and issues around trade justice and ethical consumption. It was founded in 1989 by Rob Harrison and Jane Turner and has been publishing the bi-monthly Ethical Consumer Magazine since. Its office is in Manchester.

History
Ethical Consumer was formed in Hulme, Manchester, UK in 1989. Between 1989 and 2009 it was a worker co-operative, then in 2009 became a not-for-profit multi-stakeholder co-operative consisting of worker members and investor/subscriber members. It is an industrial and provident society.

Company research and ratings 
Ethical Consumer researches the social, ethical and environmental records of companies, using media reporting, NGO reports, corporate communications and primary research.

Consumer publishing 
It publishes a bi-monthly print magazine, Ethical Consumer Magazine, sold via subscription, shops and newsstands, and a consumer website which is partly subscription based. This includes analysis of company and product ethics by sector including: Banking Sector, Energy Industry, Fashion, Food & drink, Home & Garden, Supermarkets, Technology and Transport. 

It produces reports on products and companies, and lists current boycotts.

It also produces the annual UK Ethical Consumer Markets Report in conjunction (2019) with The Co-operative Bank. This is an annual review of the facts and figures around ethical consumption in the UK.

Campaigning 
Ethical Consumer runs consumer oriented campaigns, including a boycott against Amazon.com, Inc. for its use of tax avoidance.

Consultancy work 
Ethical Consumer also undertakes consultancy, research and ethical company screenings, primarily for NGOs and third sector clients.

See also 
 Alter-globalisation
 Anti-globalisation movement
 Business ethics
 Fair trade
 Green brands

References

External links
 

1989 establishments in the United Kingdom
Anti-corporate activism
Bi-monthly magazines published in the United Kingdom
Business ethics organizations
Consumer magazines
Contemporary philosophical literature
Co-operatives in England
Ethical consumerism
Ethics literature
Magazines established in 1989
Magazines published in Manchester
Non-profit publishers
Consumer organisations in the United Kingdom
Research organisations in the United Kingdom
Social responsibility organizations